Tritonoharpa boucheti is a species of sea snail, a marine gastropod mollusk in the family Cancellariidae, the nutmeg snails.

Distribution
This marine species occurs off Mozambique.

References

 Beu, A. G.; Maxwell, P. A. (1987). A revision of the fossil and living gastropods related to Plesiotriton Fischer, 1884 (Family Cancellariidae, Subfamily Plesiotritoninae n. subfam.). With an appendix: Genera of Buccinidae Pisaniinae related to Colubraria Schumacher, 1817. New Zealand Geological Survey Paleontological Bulletin. 54: 1–140.
 Steyn, D. G.; Lussi, M. (2005). Offshore Shells of Southern Africa: A pictorial guide to more than 750 Gastropods. Published by the authors. pp. i–vi, 1–289.
 Hemmen, J. (2007). Recent Cancellariidae. Annotated and illustrated catalogue of Recent Cancellariidae. Privately published, Wiesbaden. 428

Cancellariidae
Gastropods described in 1987